The list of Arkansas state high school swimming champions is based on the annual winner of the team competition at the state swimming tournament held by the Arkansas Activities Association.

List of Arkansas state high school boys swimming and diving champions 

The following is a list of Arkansas state champions in boys swimming & diving:

 2021 - Bentonville (19)
 2020 - Prescott High School, Prescott
 2018 - Little Rock
 2017 – Bentonville (18), Valley View
 2016 – Bentonville (17), Magnolia (3)
 2015 – Bentonville (16), Magnolia (2)
 2014 – Bentonville (15), Magnolia
 2013 – Bentonville (14),  
 2012 – Bentonville (13)
 2011 – Bentonville (12)
 2010 – Bentonville (11)
 2009 – Bentonville (10)
 2008 – Bentonville (9)
 2007 – Bentonville (8)
 2006 – Bentonville (7)
 2005 – Bentonville (6)
 2004 – LR Catholic (11)
 2003 – LR Catholic (10)
 2002 – LR Catholic (9)
 2001 – Fayetteville (10)
 2000 – Fayetteville (9)
 1999 – Bentonville (5)
 1998 – Bentonville (4)
 1997 – Bentonville (3)
 1996 – Bentonville (2)
 1995 – Jonesboro (5)
 1994 – Bentonville
 1993 – FS Southside (3)
 1992 – FS Southside (2) 
 1991 – FS Southside
 1990 – Siloam Springs 
 1989 – LR Catholic (8)
 1988 – Conway
 1987 – LR Catholic (7)
 1986 – Fayetteville (8)
 1985 – Fayetteville (7)
 1984 – LR Catholic (6)
 1983 – LR Catholic (5)
 1982 – LR Catholic (4)
 1981 – Fayetteville (6)
 1980 – LR Catholic (3)
 1979 – NA
 1978 – Fayetteville (5)
 1977 – LR Catholic (2)
 1976 – Fayetteville (4)
 1975 – NA
 1974 – Fayetteville (3)
 1973 – Fayetteville (2)
 1972 – Fayetteville 
 1971 – LR Hall (5)
 1970 – LR Hall (4), Harmony Grove
 1969 – LR Hall (3), Drew Central (2)
 1968 – Jonesboro (4), Drew Central
 1967 – Jonesboro (3), Wilson (9)
 1966 – LR Hall (2), Wilson (8)
 1965 – El Dorado, Wilson (7)
 1964 – Jonesboro (2), Warren (6)
 1963 – Jonesboro, Warren (5)
 1962 – LR Catholic, Warren (4)
 1961 – LR Hall, Warren (3)
 1960 – North Little Rock (2), Warren (2)
 1959 – Fort Smith, Warren
 1958 – LR Central (5), Crossett (6)
 1957 – Little Rock (4), Crossett (5)
 1956 – Little Rock (3), Crossett (4)
 1955 – NA
 1954 – No meet held 
 1953 – Little Rock (2), Crossett (3)
 1952 – Little Rock, Crossett (2)
 1951 – NA
 1950 – North Little Rock, Crossett

List of Arkansas state high school girls swimming and diving champions 

The following is a list of Arkansas state champions in girls swimming & diving:

 2022 - Bentonville (23)
 2021 - Bentonville (22)
 2020 - Bentonville (21)
 2019 - Bentonville (20)
 2018 - Fayetteville (5)
 2017 – Bentonville (19), Haas Hall Academy
 2016 – Bentonville (18), Haas Hall Academy
 2015 – Bentonville (17), Pulaski Academy
 2014 – Bentonville (16), Pulaski Academy
 2013 – Conway (2)
 2012 – Bentonville (15)
 2011 – Bentonville (14)
 2010 – Bentonville (13)
 2009 – Bentonville (12)
 2008 – Mount St. Mary (11)
 2007 – Bentonville (11)
 2006 – Bentonville (10)
 2005 – Bentonville (9)
 2004 – Bentonville (8)
 2003 – Bentonville (7)
 2002 – Fayetteville (4)
 2001 – LR Central (8)
 2000 – LR Central (7)
 1999 – Fayetteville (3)
 1998 – Bentonville (6)
 1997 – Bentonville (5)
 1996 – Jonesboro
 1995 – Bentonville (4)
 1994 – Bentonville (3)
 1993 – Bentonville (2)
 1992 – LR Central (6)
 1991 – Bentonville 
 1990 – LR Central (5)
 1989 – Rogers
 1988 – Conway
 1987 – Arkadelphia (2)
 1986 – Arkadelphia 
 1985 – Mount St. Mary (10)
 1984 – Mount St. Mary (9)
 1983 – Siloam Springs (2)
 1982 – Siloam Springs 
 1981 – Fayetteville (2)
 1980 – LR Central (4)
 1979 – NA
 1978 – Mount St. Mary (8)
 1977 – Mount St. Mary (7)
 1976 – Fayetteville 
 1975 – NA
 1974 – LR Hall (10)
 1973 – LR Hall (9)
 1972 – Mount St. Mary (6)
 1971 – LR Hall (8)
 1970 – LR Parkview
 1969 – LR Hall (7)
 1968 – Mount St. Mary (5)
 1967 – Mount St. Mary (4)
 1966 – LR Hall (6)
 1965 – LR Hall (5)
 1964 – LR Hall (4)
 1963 – LR Hall (3)
 1962 – Warren
 1961 – LR Hall (2)
 1960 – LR Hall
 1959 – Mount St. Mary (3)
 1958 – Mount St. Mary (2)
 1957 – Little Rock (3)
 1956 – Little Rock (2)
 1955 – NA
 1954 – No meet held
 1953 – Mount St. Mary 
 1952 – Little Rock 
 1951 – NA
 1950 – North Little Rock

Most state championships

See also 

 Arkansas Activities Association
 List of Arkansas state high school football champions
 List of Arkansas state high school basketball champions
 List of Arkansas state high school baseball champions
 List of Arkansas state high school soccer champions

References

External links 
 Swimming at Arkansas Activities Association

Swimming
Arkansas high school
high school swimming